Native Ryme Syndicate is an Australian hip hop group formed in Brisbane, Queensland. Native Ryme Syndicate won a Deadly award in 1998 for Most Promising New Talent. They were the first Australian urban music group to the elite music festivals and have played with Spiderbait, Regurgitator and 28 Days as well as at the Big Day Out and Livid festivals. Named as one of the best unknown rap/hip-hop music groups in the World by Grammy Award-winning US group Naughty By Nature (Tour 2004). The group are known today as Native Ryme. Native Ryme are releasing their debut full-length album in 2013 after 19 years since formation.

Discography
Native Ryme Syndicate (2006)

References

External links
Native Ryme Website page

Musical groups from Brisbane
Australian hip hop groups
Indigenous Australian musical groups